Zinc finger protein 473 is a protein that in humans is encoded by the ZNF473 gene.

References

Further reading